Benjamin Davis (Ben) Shelton (born September 21, 1969), is a former Major League Baseball left fielder who played in 1993 with the Pittsburgh Pirates. He batted right and threw left-handed. He was drafted by the Pirates in the second round of the 1987 draft.

External links

1969 births
Living people
Major League Baseball outfielders
Baseball players from Chicago
Pittsburgh Pirates players
Gulf Coast Pirates players
Princeton Pirates players
Augusta Pirates players
Salem Buccaneers players
Carolina Mudcats players
Buffalo Bisons (minor league) players
Salt Lake Buzz players
Hardware City Rock Cats players
Trenton Thunder players
American expatriate baseball players in Australia